Live Bait, Vol. 03 - Worcester Sampler is a live download by band Phish. The song selection was compiled by Phish archivist Kevin Shapiro, and was released November 2010. This download features highlights from Phish's previous appearances in Worcester, Massachusetts. The compilation covers appearances from 1991 to 1997, and was released shortly before Phish played in Worcester on December 27 and 28, 2010. Of note is the version of "Runaway Jim" that is present here, as it may be the longest jam in Phish's career. It was available for free on the official Phish website for a short time. It is now available for purchase from Phish's LivePhish website.

Track listing 
 "Countdown/Auld Lang Syne" (Traditional) - 2:03 (1993-12-31 Worcester Centrum -  Worcester, MA)
 "Down With Disease" (Anastasio, Marshall)  - 3:38 (1993-12-31 Worcester Centrum -  Worcester, MA)
 "Split Open and Melt" (Anastasio) - 10:06 (1993-12-31 Worcester Centrum -  Worcester, MA)
 "Runaway Jim" (Abrahams, Anastasio) - 58:47 (1997-11-29 Worcester Centrum - Worcester, MA)
 "Llama" (Anastasio) - 4:58 (1991-12-31 Worcester Memorial Auditorium "The New Aud" -  Worcester, MA)

External links 
 Phish.com - Official Site
 LivePhish.com - Live Bait Vol. 03

Phish live albums
LivePhish.com Downloads
2010 live albums